The World Championship is an annual competition started in 1955 for BriSCA Formula 1 Stock Cars. It is the premier championship of the formula and the winner is granted the honour of racing with a gold roof and wing until the next World Final, and if desired they can race under number 1.

Qualification
The World Final is usually held in September. The host tracks, all of which are based in the UK, are decided by the BriSCA promoters.

The grid for the World Final is mostly composed of drivers from the UK who are chosen through a series of qualifying rounds and two World Championship Semi-Finals. Drivers who fail to progress from the World Semi-Finals may race again in a Consolation Semi-Final to choose two more entrants, and the reigning World Champion is entitled to start at the rear of the grid if they have not already qualified. The UK drivers are joined by stock car drivers from the Netherlands, and by invited drivers in the nearest equivalent motorsport formulas from other countries often including Australia, New Zealand, South Africa and the USA.

The most successful driver in World Final races is John Lund, who has won eight. Other notable multiple winners include Stuart Smith (six), Andy Smith (five), Peter Falding (four), Johnny Brise, Dave Chisholm and Frankie Wainman Junior (three).

List of winners
There were two races promoted as the World Championship in 1955, at Harringay and Belle Vue.

All drivers are British, except where marked.

References

External links
 World Final Statistics at BriSCAF1stox.com

Stock car racing in the United Kingdom
Stock car racing series
Auto racing series in the United Kingdom
Motorsport competitions in the United Kingdom